TOI-1227 b is one of the youngest transiting exoplanets discovered (as of September 2022), alongside K2-33b and HIP 67522 b. The exoplanet TOI-1227 b is about 11±2 Myrs old and currently  large. It will become a  planet in about 1 billion years, because the planet is still contracting. TOI-1227 b orbits a very low-mass star every 27.36 days.

Characteristics 
TOI-1227 b has a size that is 85% that of Jupiter. No other Jupiter-sized planet was detected around mid- to late M-dwarfs, despite the deep transits such a planet would create. The researchers find that the planet is still hot from its formation and this heat, combined with a hydrogen-dominated primary atmosphere makes the atmosphere of TOI-1227 b inflated. Evolutionary models suggest that TOI-1227 b will eventually evolve into a sub-Neptune within the next billion years.

Future research 
Radial velocity follow-up to determine the mass of TOI-1227 b is not possible in the optical, but might be possible in the near-infrared. A less challenging follow-up would be the measurement of the Spin-Orbit-Alignment via the Rossiter-McLaughlin effect.

Host star 
TOI-1227 is located north of the globular cluster NGC 4372, but it is much closer to earth than this cluster of stars at a distance of about 101 parsec.

TOI-1227 was first identified as a pre-main-sequence star (PMS star) with the Gaia satellite. Without this prior identification as a PMS star the exoplanet signal of TOI-1227 b would have been disregarded as an eclipsing binary due to the V-shape of the transit signal.

The host star TOI-1227 is part of a subgroup of the Lower Centaurus Crux OB association, sometimes called B, A0 and called Musca group by the scientists that discovered TOI-1227 b. This group was called Musca after the constellation Musca in which most of its members are located.

TOI-1227 has a spectral type of M4.5V to M5V, a mass 17% of the sun and a radius 56% of the sun. The host star is relative faint for a TOI with a V-band magnitude of about 17. The host star shows Lithium in its atmosphere, which should be depleted within 10-200 Myrs for M-dwarfs.

References 

1227
Transiting exoplanets
Exoplanets discovered in 2022
Protoplanets